Long is the pinyin romanization of a Chinese surname. It includes  / , which means "dragon" in Chinese, ranking number 80 on the list of common Chinese surnames in 2006, up from 108 in 1990. Another name transcribed as Long is 隆, which is very rare in contemporary China. In Hong Kong, these names are romanized as Lung. In Wade-Giles it is also romanized as Lung.

Notable people
 Long Ju, military general who served Xiang Yu during the Chu–Han Contention (died 203 BC)
 Long Qingquan, Chinese weightlifter
 Long Yan, (born 1973) Chinese former synchronized swimmer who competed in the 1996 Summer Olympics
 Long Yun (1884–1962), governor and warlord of the Chinese province of Yunnan
 James Lung Wai-man is the chairman of the Southern Democratic Alliance in Hong Kong
 Lung Ying-tai (born 1952), Taiwanese essayist and cultural critic
 Anders Ljungstedt (23 March 1759 – 10 November 1835) Swedish merchant and historian

References

Chinese-language surnames
Individual Chinese surnames